Los Vientos Wind Farm is a 912 megawatt (MW) wind farm in Starr and Willacy counties in South Texas. It is the second largest wind farm in the United States behind the Alta Wind Energy Center in California.

Facility details 
The project was constructed in five phases. Construction commenced in 2012 and was completed in 2016. The energy generated by the five projects is purchased by five different customers.

A two year study conducted at the facility by Texas State University, Duke Energy Renewables, and NRG Systems found that an ultrasonic system developed by NRG Systems was able to reduce fatalities of some bat species by more than 50%. In 2019, Duke Energy began installing the deterrent systems at 255 turbines in Los Vientos III, IV, and V. Installation of the systems is expected to take five years.

Overview

See also 

Wind power in the United States
List of onshore wind farms
Wind power in Texas
List of power stations in Texas

References 

Wind farms in Texas
Buildings and structures in Starr County, Texas
Buildings and structures in Willacy County, Texas
Energy infrastructure completed in 2016
Duke Energy
2016 establishments in Texas